The 1929 Curtiss Model 53 Condor, also known as the Curtiss Model 53 Condor 18 or the Curtiss CO Condor, was a civil passenger version of the Model 52 Condor bomber. A twin-engined biplane, it carried 18 passengers.

Design and development

The Model 53 was an airliner version of the Model 52 Condor B-2 bomber, also introduced in 1929. It was a large, equal span, three bay biplane with parallel pairs of interplane struts. Its wings had a rectangular plan out to rounded tips. Like the rest of the aircraft, they had an all-metal structure and were fabric covered. The first three Model 53s were modified B-2s on which only the lower wing was set with dihedral (5°); the three built from scratch had dihedral on both wings. There were ailerons on both upper and lower wings, externally connected.

Its two  Curtiss Conqueror pressurized water-cooled V-12 engines were mounted on top of the lower wing in long cowlings. Geared down from an engine optimum 2,400 rpm by a factor of two, they drove three-bladed propellers.  They were cooled by longitudinally oriented, rectangular profile radiators proud above each cowling. Their nacelles were long, extending beyond the trailing edges, containing the fuel tanks behind the engines and, unusually, baggage holds at their rears.

The Condor had a rectangular section fuselage. The flight crew of two sat side-by-side in an enclosed cabin entered by built-in ladder and floor hatch. The normal arrangement in the passenger cabin behind them, high enough for a tall passenger to stand upright, was six rows of three seats accessed by a side aisle. These could be subdivided by screens for privacy or modified to contain a sleeper cabin with berths for four; for night flights a twelve berth all sleeper configuration was proposed. Particular attention was given to sound insulation and to ventilation; the Condor was the first airliner to feature cabin steam heating. The flight attendant had a space at the rear, where there was also a toilet.

The lower tailplane of the Condor's biplane tail unit was mounted on top of the fuselage with the upper one held above it by the twin fins and central struts. Its rudders were generous and balanced.

The Condor had a fixed, conventional, wide track landing gear Its independent wheels, equipped with brakes, were on short vertical legs and had trailing drag struts from the engine mountings and transverse struts to the central fuselage underside. Its tailskid was tall and sprung.

Operational history

The first civil Condor, converted from a military Model 52, flew for the first time on 21 July 1929. Including the prototype, six were built. Of these, the first three were converted from bomber model 52s. They operated with TAT and Eastern Air Line, though only for about a year. The Conqueror's development was never quite completed and in 1932 the US Army, after spending large sums on it, withdrew support and turned to air-cooled engines.

Operators

T.A.T.
Eastern Air Lines

Specifications (CO Condor)

References

Further reading

Biplanes
Twin piston-engined tractor aircraft
1920s United States airliners
Curtiss aircraft